Lipperlandhalle is an indoor sporting arena located at the Innovation Campus Lemgo, Germany.  The capacity of the arena is 5,000 people.  It hosted some matches at the 2007 World Men's Handball Championship.

External links 

Handball venues in Germany
Indoor arenas in Germany
Buildings and structures in Lippe
Sports venues in North Rhine-Westphalia